NGC 196 is a lenticular galaxy located in the constellation Cetus. It was discovered on December 28, 1790 by William Herschel.

References

External links
 

0196
0405
+00-02-107
Lenticular galaxies
Cetus (constellation)
Discoveries by William Herschel
002357